Dafnero is a village in Kozani regional unit, Greece. It is part of the municipal unit Siatista. The 2011 census reported a population of 72.

References

Populated places in Kozani (regional unit)
Siatista